100 great Estonians of the 20th century is a list of notable Estonians compiled in 1999 by Eesti Entsüklopeediakirjastus, Eesti Päevaleht, National Library of Estonia, Radio Kuku, and TV3.

The list includes 20 scientists, 20 social figures, 15 writers, 13 in theater, film and journalism, 12 musicians, 10 artists, and 10 sportsmen.  The best known scientist of the century was semiotician Juri Lotman, politician was Lennart Meri, musician Gustav Ernesaks, and sportsman was chess grandmaster Paul Keres.

100 great Estonians of the 20th century in alphabetical order:

 Amandus Adamson (1855–1929) sculptor and painter
 Ants Antson (1938–2015) speed skater
 Ants Eskola (1908–1989) actor
 Artur Alliksaar (1923–1966) poet
 August Gailit (1891–1960) writer
 Betti Alver (1906–1989) poet
 Ernst Jaakson (1905–1998) diplomat
 Gustav Ernesaks (1908–1993) composer and choir conductor
 Heino Eller (1887–1970) composer and composition teacher
 Ita Ever (1931–) actress
 Jaan Einasto (1929–) astrophysicist
 Jakob Hurt (1839–1906) theologian
 Johannes Aavik (1880–1973) philologist
 Johannes Hint (1914–1985) scientist
 Jüri Arrak (1936–) painter
 Kaarel Eenpalu (1888–1942) head of state, died in prison camps in Soviet Union
 Miina Härma (1864–1941) composer
 Paul Ariste (1905–1990) linguist
 Pavel Bogovski (1919–1995) oncologist and pathologist
 Jüri Järvet (1919–1995) actor
 Neeme Järvi (1937–) conductor
 Fred Jüssi (1935–) biologist
 Tõnu Kaljuste (1953–) conductor
 Siim Kallas (1948–) politician
 Edgar Kant (1902–1978) geographer and economist 
 Tunne Kelam (1936–) Estonian politician and Member of the European Parliament 
 Paul Keres (1916–1975) chess grandmaster
 August Kitzberg (1855–1927) writer
 Eri Klas (1939–2016) conductor
 Paul Kogerman (1891–1951) chemist
 Jaan Koort (1883–1935) sculptor and painter
 Johannes Kotkas (1915–1998) Greco-Roman wrestler
 Jaan Kross (1920–2007) writer
 Eerik Kumari (1912–1984) doctor of biology
 Julius Kuperjanov (1894–1914) military officer
 Mart Laar (1960–) politician and historian
 Johan Laidoner (1884–1953) general and statesman
 Ants Laikmaa (1866–1942) painter
 Juhan Liiv (1864–1913) poet
 Heino Lipp (1922–2006) decathlete
 Endel Lippmaa (1930–2015) academic and politician 
 Juri Lotman (1922-1993) cultural historian
 Georg Lurich (1876–1920) Greco-Roman wrestler
 Oskar Luts (1866–1953) writer
 Rein Maran (1931–) director and cinematographer
 Alo Mattiisen (1961–1996) composer
 Lennart Meri (1929–2006) film director and second President of Estonia
 Felix Moor (1903–1955), journalist and actor
 Harri Moora (1900–1968) archaeologist
 Konrad Mägi (1878–1925) painter
 Erki Nool (1970–) sportsman, politician
 Ülo Nugis (1944–2011) politician and economist
 Pent Nurmekund (1936–1996), linguist, philologist, polyglot, Orientalist and poet
 Evald Okas (1915–2011) painter, known for nudes
 Ernst Öpik (1893–1985) astronomer and astrophysicist
 Karl Orviku (1920–1975) geologist
 Georg Ots (1908–1987) singer and actor
 Kristjan Palusalu (1908–1987) wrestler, Olympic winner
 Voldemar Panso (1920–1977) actor, stage director and theatre pedagogue
 Valdo Pant (1928–1976) journalist 
 Erast Parmasto (1928-2012)
 Juhan Peegel (1919–2007) journalist, linguist, academic and writer
 Paul Pinna (1884–1949) actor, stage director and theatre pedagogue
 Johan Pitka (1872–1944?) military officer during the Estonian War of Independence
 Jaan Poska (1866–1920) barrister and politician
 Ludvig Puusepp (1875–1942) first professor of neurosurgery
 Arvo Pärt (1935–) composer of religious music
 Konstantin Päts (1874–1956) politician
 Kristjan Raud (1865–1943) painter
 Anna Raudkats (1886–1965) folk dance teacher and cataloger
 Anto Raukas (1935–2021) geologist, academic and sportsman
 Liina Reiman (1891–1961) actress
 Günther Reindorff (1899–1974) graphic designer
 Karl Ristikivi (1912–1977) writer
 Hando Runnel (1938–) poet and publisher
 Arnold Rüütel (1928–) The last Chairman of the Presidium of the Supreme Soviet of the Estonian SSR 
 Erika Salumäe (1962–) track bicycle racer
 Edgar Savisaar (1950–) politician
 Arnold Seppo (1917–1980) surgeon and traumatologist
 Anton Starkopf (1889–1966) sculptor
 Toomas Sulling (1940–) cardiac and vascular surgeon
 Jaan Talts (1944–) weightlifter
 A. H. Tammsaare (1878–1940) writer
 Andres Tarand (1940–) former Prime Minister of Estonia
 Enn Tarto (1938–2021) leading dissident during Soviet Union occupation
 Rudolf Tobias (1873–1918) composer
 Veljo Tormis (1930–2017) composer
 Friedebert Tuglas (1886–1971) writer
 Jaan Tõnisson (1868–1941) State Elder
 Jüri Uluots (1890–1945) attorney and journalist
 Marie Under (1883–1980) poet
 Jaak Uudmäe (1954–) long jumper at Olympics
 Voldemar Vaga (1899–1999) art and architecture historian
 Raimond Valgre (1913–1949) composer
 Juhan Viiding (1948–1995) poet and actor
 Eduard Viiralt (1898–1954) graphic artist
 Eduard Vilde (1965–1933) writer
 Jüri Vilms (1889–1918) member of the Estonian Salvation Committee 
 Vaino Väljas (1931–) Soviet politician

References

Lists of Estonian people